Pir Sara (also Romanized as Pīr Sarā; also known as Pīrsarāi, Pirsaran, and Pīr Sarāy) is a village in Rostamabad-e Shomali Rural District, in the Central District of Rudbar County, Gilan Province, Iran. At the 2006 census, its population was 23, in 6 families.

References 

Populated places in Rudbar County